Indigenous may refer to:
Indigenous peoples
Indigenous (ecology), presence in a region as the result of only natural processes, with no human intervention
Indigenous (band), an American blues-rock band 
Indigenous (horse), a Hong Kong racehorse
Indigenous (film), Australian, 2016

See also 
Disappeared indigenous women
Indigenous Australians
Indigenous language
Indigenous religion
Indigenous peoples in Canada
Native (disambiguation)